Veľké Ripňany is a village and municipality in the Topoľčany District of the Nitra Region, Slovakia. In 2011 the village had 2071 inhabitants.

References

External links

 
http://en.e-obce.sk/obec/velkeripnany/velke-ripnany.html

Villages and municipalities in Topoľčany District